McBean Creek is a stream in the U.S. state of Georgia. It is a tributary to the Savannah River.

McBean Creek was named after one Mr. McBean, a pioneer settler in the 18th century.

References

Rivers of Georgia (U.S. state)
Rivers of Burke County, Georgia
Rivers of Richmond County, Georgia